Kur  is a panchayat village in Rajasthan in western India. Administratively, it is under Bhopalgarh tehsil, Jodhpur District of the state of Rajasthan.

There are three villages in the Kood gram panchayat: Kur, Hinganiya (Hingania) and Khokhariya (Khokharia).

Demographics 
In the 2001 census, the village of Kur had 2,042 inhabitants, with 1,044 males (51.1%) and 998 females (48.9%), for a gender ratio of 956 females per thousand males.

Notes

Villages in Jodhpur district